Richard Garrigues is a naturalist, writer and videographer, originally from suburban New Jersey, who has lived in Costa Rica since 1981, where he leads birding and natural history tours. Since April 2000, he has been posting the Gone Birding Newsletter online. In June 2005 he also began to study the birds of northwestern Ecuador.

Published works
The Birds of Costa Rica, illustrated by Robert Dean, 2007
The birds of Costa Rica, a field guide, Second edition illustrated by Robert Dean, 2014

References

External links
Aimophila Adventures: The Experience of Birding! book review
Finding Birds in Costa Rica, his website for his tours, book & materials & Costa Rica in general

American naturalists
Birdwatchers
Living people
American nature writers
American male non-fiction writers
Year of birth missing (living people)